Katrin Beinroth (West Germany, 15 September 1981 – 26 June 2020) was a German judoka.

Achievements

References

External links
 

1981 births
2020 deaths
German female judoka
20th-century German women
21st-century German women